Historiography in North Macedonia is the methodology of historical studies used by the historians of that country. It has been developed since 1945 when SR Macedonia became part of Yugoslavia. According to the German historian  it has preserved nearly the same agenda as the Marxist historiography from the times of the Socialist Federal Republic of Yugoslavia. The generation of Macedonian historians closely associated with the Yugoslav period who worked on the actual national myths of that time are still in charge of the institutions. In fact, in the field of historiography, Yugoslav communism and Macedonian nationalism are closely related. After the Fall of communism Macedonian historiography didn't revise profoundly its communist past, because the very Macedonian nation was a result of the communist policies.

According to the Austrian historian , modern Macedonian historiography is highly politicized, because the Macedonian nation-building process is still in development. Diverging approaches are discouraged and people who express alternative views risk economic limitations, failure of academic career and stigmatization as "national traitors". Troebst wrote already in 1983 that historical research in the SR Macedonia was not a humanist, civilizing end in itself, but was about direct political action. No such case of reciprocal dependence of historiography and politics has been observed in modern Europe. Because of the complexity of the case, the Macedonian historiography could be described as a state "ideology". Additionally, in North Macedonia, the discipline of archaeology has often been placed in the service of the state and used to legitimate nationalist claims to history, culture, and territory. 

Although ethnic Macedonians do not appear in primary sources before 1870, the first generation of Macedonian historians after WWII traced the Macedonian ethnogenesis to the beginning of the 19th century.  However the Medieval history was extremely important for the traditions of modern Macedonian nationalism. Thus, after 1960 they fabricated the myth that Samuel of Bulgaria was Macedonian by nationality. Moreover, after 2010 a nation-building project was promoted to impose the deceptive idea that the Macedonian nation was the oldest on the Balkans, with an unbroken continuity from Antiquity to Modern times. Some domestic and foreign scholars have criticized this agenda of a denialist historiography, whose goal is to affirm the continuous existence of a separate Macedonian nation throughout history. This controversial worldview is ahistorical, as it projects modern ethnic distinctions into the past. Such an enhanced, ethnocentric reading of history contributes to the distortion of the Macedonian national identity and degrades history as an academic discipline. Under such historiographies generations of students were educated in pseudo-history.

History 
In 1892 Georgi Pulevski, the first Macedonian national activist, completed a "General History of the Macedonian Slavs", but his knowledge of history was very modest. However, the contemporary Macedonian historical narrative is rooted in communist groups active during the interwar period, especially in the 1930s, when the Comintern issued a special resolution in their support. According to them, the Macedonian nation was forged through a differentiation from the earlier Bulgarian nation. The Macedonian awakening in the 19th century took place as part of the Bulgarian National Revival, but managed to evolve separately in the early 20th century. One of them — Vasil Ivanovski, declared for the first time that many Bulgarian historical figures were ethnic Macedonians. It was only after the Second World War, however, that those writings were widely appreciated, as prior to the establishment of Communist Yugoslavia, the existence of a separate Macedonian nation was still not recognized.

The glorification of the Yugoslav partisan movement became one of the main components of the post-war Yugoslav political propaganda. As a result, the leader of the new Socialist Republic of Macedonia – Lazar Koliševski, initially proclaimed that its history has begun with the start of the communist struggle during the Second World War, while early 20th century events and organizations as the Ilinden Uprising and the IMRO were mere Bulgarian conspiracies. In the same time, the first rector of the University of Skopje Kiril Miljovski admitted that the Macedonian revivalists defined themselves as Bulgarians, and later the Macedonian revolutionaries such as Gotse Delchev used the literary Bulgarian and in their rhetoric it is difficult to find a treatment of the Macedonian Slavs as something different from the other Bulgarian ethnographic groups. Following direct political instructions from Belgrade, those historical studies were expanded. New Macedonian historiography held, as a central principle, that Macedonian history was distinctively different from that of Bulgaria. Its primary goal was to create a separate Macedonian national consciousness, with an "anti-Bulgarian" or "de-Bulgarizing" trend, and to sever any ties with Bulgaria. This distinct Slavic consciousness would inspire identification with Yugoslavia.

The first national scientific institution in this field – the Institute for National History of the PR Macedonia was established in 1948. The historiographic narrative in the first two decades afterwards was expanded to the early 19th century, during which, as it was believed then, was the beginning of the history of the Macedonian people. However, the personalities from the area included into the new narrative also played a significant role in the Bulgarian National Revival. This problem was solved by the Communist system with censorship, control on historical information, and manipulations. Numerous prominent activists with pro-Bulgarian sentiments from the 19th and the early 20th centuries were described as (ethnic) Macedonians. Due to the fact that in many documents of that period the local Slavic population is not referred to as "Macedonian" but as "Bulgarian", Macedonian historians argue that it was Macedonian, regardless of what is written in the records. They have also claimed that "Bulgarian" at that time was a term, not related to any ethnicity, but was used as a synonym for "Slavic", "Christian" or "peasant".

Since the late 1960s, efforts have been made to expand the narrative into the Middle Ages. In 1969, the first academic "History of the Macedonian nation" was published, where many historical figures from the area who had lived in the last millennium as Samuel of Bulgaria, were described as people with a "Macedonian (Slavic) identity". When the historians from the Skopje University published in 1985 their collection of documents on the struggle of the Macedonian people, they included into the excerpts of the medieval chronicles a footnote for every use of the term Bulgarian. Almost all of the new historical agenda was traditionally claimed by the Bulgarian national historiography and till today it disputes the Macedonian historical readings.

Post-independence 
 

The situation did not change significantly after the Republic of Macedonia gained independence in the late 20th century. The historiography did not revise much of the Yugoslav past, because almost all of its historical myths were constructed during the communist era. The reluctance for a thorough reevaluation of Yugoslav communist historiography was mainly caused by the fact that the very Macedonian nation, state and language were a result of Yugoslav communist policies, where this historiography had played a crucial role. For the mainstream local political establishment, an attitude against Communist Yugoslavia is seen as anti-Macedonism. 

Macedonian historiography became important in the early 21st century in the face of an unsure reevaluation of the Yugoslav past and of an uneasy articulation of a new anticommunist narrative. It has sought a new horizon behind the mythological symbolism of ancient Macedon. For that purpose, the borders of the ancient state were extended towards the north, much further than its actual historical extent. According to this new narrative, most of the cultural achievements of the Ancient Macedonians were actually (ethnic) Macedonian and therefore, Hellenism's true name would be Macedonism. This new historical trend, called antiquization, made the Macedonian nationality a thousand years older. In this view Ancient Macedonians were not Ancient Greek people and a separate existence of Ancient Macedonians in the Early Middle Ages is maintained, 800 years after the fall of their kingdom, as well as their admixture in the Byzantine Empire with the arriving early Slavic settlers in the late 6th century.

In 2009, the first Macedonian Encyclopedia was issued by the Macedonian Academy of Sciences and Arts. The issuance of the encyclopedia caused  international and internal protest because of its content and its authors have been subjected to severe criticism. Even some Macedonian academics criticised the book as hastily prepared and politically motivated. Soon the scandalous encyclopedia was withdrawn from bookstores. In 2008, the Macedonian Canadian historian, Andrew Rossos, published the first professional English language overview of the history of Macedonia. However, Stefan Troebst suggests that his narrative is enough affected by the views in the R. Macedonia and thus is representing the latest developments in the Macedonian historiography as viewed in Skopje.

Alternative views 

After the fall of Communism, historical revisionists in the Republic of Macedonia questioned the narrative established in Communist Yugoslavia. People such as Ivan Mikulčić, Zoran Todorovski and Slavko Milosavlevski tried to openly oppose the popular historical myths in the Republic of Macedonia. Mikulčić, for example, proved through archaeological evidence that there weren't any ancient Macedonians when the Early Slavs arrived in Macedonia. He also found several Bulgar settlements on the territory of the modern republic and argued the Slavs in Macedonia adopted the ethnonym Bulgarians in the 9th century. Todorovski has argued that all Macedonian revolutionaries from the early 20th century and beyond identified themselves as Bulgarians. Milosavlevski challenged the myth of the significance of the communist partisan resistance movement against the Bulgarian fascist occupiers during the WW2. According to Macedonian pathologist and then-MP Vesna Janevska, the conflict during WWII was a fratricidal or civil war. Per Macedonian philosopher Katerina Kolozova, the historical myth about the Bulgarian fascist occupiers is groundless, because significant part of these occupiers were practically local collaborators of the Bulgarian authorities. According to her, today the connection of Macedonian identity with the Yugoslav partisans' activity during WWII has been so deep rooted in the society, that it seems to be a consensus among historians there, that any revision of that communist historical myth is unimaginable. Such studies became the only exception to the new Macedonian historiography, with most historians staying loyal to the political elite, writing publications appropriating the Hellenistic part of the Macedonian past, the medieval Bulgarian Empire and the Bulgarian national revival from the Ottoman period.

This policy of claiming ethnic Macedonian past during Ancient, Medieval and Ottoman times is facing criticism by other academics and politicians in the country itself, such as Denko Maleski, Miroslav Grčev, Ljubčo Georgievski and others. It demonstrates feebleness of archaeology and historiography, as well as some kind of ethnic marginalization. These intellectuals from the Macedonian elite admit that the distinct Macedonian nation is a recent phenomenon that developed in the years around the Second World War. Such views are spread among well educated citizens that search for the scientific resolution of the nation-building process. Despite significant parts of the leading establishment strongly opposing the articulation of such views, some prominent members of the elite disclose their rational views. According to the film director Darko Mitrevski, if Macedonians do not accept their real history, they will be a nation with historical complexes. They will remain at loggerheads with their neighbors if they continue to build out a fictional history of styrofoam. According to him, such a nation does not need a history, but psychiatry.

Foreign historiographic studies 
The mainstream European historiography maintains that the idea of a separate Macedonian nation was developed mainly during the Second World War and was adopted en masse immediately after it. Per Carsten Wieland, Stefan Troebst sees the Macedonian nation building as an ideal example of Gellner's theory of nationalism. Since the creation of the Yugoslav Macedonia it was realized immediately. Whether in Antiquity the Ancient Macedonians were originally a Greek tribe or not is ultimately a redundant question according to professor of anthropology Loring Danforth. John Van Antwerp Fine states that throughout the Middle Ages and Ottoman era modern Bulgarians and Macedonians comprised a single people. Per Bernard Lory the ethnic divergence between Bulgarians and Macedonians occurred mainly in the first half of the 20th century. Alexander Maxwell maintains that scarcely by the middle of that century, Macedonians began to see Macedonian and Bulgarian loyalties as mutually exclusive. According to historian Eugene N. Borza, the Macedonians, who are a recently emergent people and have had no history, are in search of their past. This search is an attempt to help legitimize their unsure present, surviving in the disorder of Balkan politics. Anthropologist Ivaylo Dichev claims that the Macedonian historiography has the impossible task of filling in the huge gaps between the ancient kingdom of Macedon that collapsed in the 2nd century BC, the 10th-11th century state of the Cometopuli, and Yugoslav Macedonia, established in the middle of the 20th century. Despite the myths of national purity and continuity that came to dominate the official Macedonian historiography, something not unusual for the Balkan region, Ipek Yosmaoglu affirms there is not much to be gained from a search for a Macedonian national lineage, because the Macedonian nationhood was shaped mainly in the decades following World War II.

Recent developments 

Surveys on the effects of the controversial nation-building project Skopje 2014 and on the perceptions of the population of Skopje revealed a high degree of uncertainty regarding the latter's national identity. A supplementary national poll showed that there was a great discrepancy between the population's sentiment and the narrative the state sought to promote. According to F.A.K. Yasamee, the Macedonia are a striking instance of the mutability of national identity. 

Recently, the Macedonian political elite seems interested in a debate about the national historical narrative with Bulgaria and Greece. With respect to the Macedonian narrative, both Greek and Bulgarian historiographies have questioned the Macedonian historiography's factual basis, because it was constructed to come into conflict with the former two. Per Michael R. Palairet in the three-way dispute about Macedonia, the Bulgarian view is closer to the objective reality of history than either the Greek or Macedonian view, but the Macedonian historiographical version violates common sense and the historical record much more than either the Greek or Bulgarian ones.

The governments of Bulgaria and Macedonia signed a friendship treaty to bolster the complicated relations between the two Balkan states in August 2017. On its ground a joint commission on historical and educational issues was formed in 2018. This intergovernmental commission is a forum where controversial historical issues will be raised and discussed, to resolve the problematic readings of history. In June 2018, Greece and Macedonia also signed an agreement to end their long disputes, which resulted in Macedonia being renamed the Republic of North Macedonia in February 2019. It also provides for the creation of a commission similar to that of the treaty signed with Bulgaria. In an interview given in 2019, the co-president of the joint historical commission with Bulgaria from the Macedonian side - prof. Dragi Gjorgiev, has appealed that it is necessary to acknowledge, that there have been forgeries made from the Macedonian side. Thus, instead of "Bulgarian" as in the original artifacts, in the Macedonian textbooks it was written "Macedonian". According to him, for many years the historiography in North Macedonia has been a function of the process of nation-building.

However, with nationalism in the three countries rising, there are still Greek and Bulgarian scholars who claim a Macedonian nation did not exist until the middle of the 20th century and therefore could not exist in the present. In Skopje, meanwhile, there are growing concerns that the negotiations with the country's neighbors over its history may jeopardize the Macedonian government or even lead to violence and internal clashes. In early October 2019, Bulgaria has set a lot of tough terms for North Macedonia's EU progress. The Bulgarian government accepted an ultimate "Framework Position", where it has warned that Bulgaria will not allow the EU integration of North Macedonia to be accompanied by European legitimization of an anti-Bulgarian ideology, sponsored by Skopje's authorities. In the list there are more than 20 demands and a timetable to fulfill them, during the process of North Macedonia's accession negotiations. It states that the rewriting of the history of part of the Bulgarian people after 1944 was one of the pillars of the bulgarophobic agenda of then Yugoslav communism. Bulgarian National Assembly voted on 10 October and approved this "Framework Position" put forward by the government on the EU accession of North Macedonia. As a result, in an interview with Bulgarian media in November 2020, the Macedonian Prime Minister Zoran Zaev stated that, among other things, Bulgaria was not a fascist occupier during WWII and together with the Macedonian Partisans, participated in battles for driving away the Germans from the area in 1944. This sparked criticism and accusations by Macedonian public figures, politicians and historians of historical revisionism. The leader of VMRO-DPMNE, Hristijan Mickoski stated that he was concerned that the negiotiation process with Bulgaria could threaten the Macedonian national identity. Protests arose demanding Zaev's resignation. According to the former Macedonian Prime Minister Ljubčo Georgievski, those reactions were the result of ignorance, hypocrisy or politicking.

On November 17, 2020, Bulgaria blocked the official start of accession talks with North Macedonia. One of the main reasons provided by the Bulgarian side for the decision was an 'ongoing nation-building process' based on historical negationism of the Bulgarian identity, culture and legacy in the broader region of Macedonia. The acknowledgement of Bulgarian influence on Macedonian history is highly problematic, because it clashes with the post-WWII Yugoslav Macedonian nation-building narrative, based on an anti-Bulgarian stance. In August 2022, the joint historical commission reached an agreement and recommended the joint commemoration of historical figures like Cyril and Methodius, Clement of Ohrid, Saint Naum and Tsar Samuel. In September 2022, after a meeting which lacked progress, the co-chairman of the joint historical commission from the Bulgarian side claimed that their Macedonian colleagues complained that they were being pressured and threatened by the public in North Macedonia to not agree to any changes in the historical narrative inherited there. This however, was denied by the co-chairman of the joint historical commission from the Macedonian side, stating that such statements lead to the politicization of the Commission and the deterioration of the relations between the two countries.

Gallery

See also
Macedonian Question
Macedonian nationalism
History of North Macedonia
2018 Macedonian referendum

References

Bilateral relations of North Macedonia
Ethnocentrism
Historical negationism
 
History of Macedonia (region)
History of North Macedonia
Pseudohistory
Anti-Bulgarian sentiment
Macedonian nationalism